Joseph Kiptum (born 1956) is a Kenyan former long-distance runner. He was a frequent participant at the IAAF World Cross Country Championships for Kenya in the 1980s and made a total of seven appearances in the senior race from 1981 to 1990.

His best finish at the competition was third at the 1986 IAAF World Cross Country Championships, finishing behind teammate John Ngugi and Abebe Mekonnen. He was a point-scoring member of the Kenyan team on four occasions and shared in three team titles with the Kenyan men in 1986, 1988, and 1989.

He was a one-time Kenyan champion on the track, winning the 10,000 metres in 1987.

International competitions

National titles
Kenyan Athletics Championships
10,000 metres: 1987

References

External links

Living people
1956 births
Kenyan male long-distance runners
Kenyan male cross country runners